{{DISPLAYTITLE:C20H18O6}}
The molecular formula C20H18O6 (molar mass: 354.35 g/mol, exact mass: 354.1103 u) may refer to:
 
 Carpanone, a lignan
 Luteone (isoflavone)
 Sesamin, a lignan 

Molecular formulas